The  Netherlands lunar sample displays  are two commemorative plaques consisting of small fragments of Moon specimens brought back with the Apollo 11 and Apollo 17 Moon missions and given to the people of the Netherlands by President Richard Nixon as goodwill gifts.

Description

Apollo 11

Apollo 17

History 

According to Moon rock researcher Robert Pearlman, both the Netherlands Apollo 11 and Apollo 17 lunar sample displays are in the National Museum of the History of Science and Medicine in Leiden, Netherlands.

The Rijksmuseum of the Netherlands said in 1992 that it received a fake moon rock from the estate of Netherlands Prime Minister Willem Drees.

See also
 List of Apollo lunar sample displays

References

Further reading

External links 

 Partial list of Apollo  11, 12, 14, 15, 16, and 17 sample locations, NASA Johnson Space Center

Netherlands–United States relations
Tourist attractions in the Netherlands